Michael James Vogel (born July 17, 1979) is an American actor and former model. Vogel began acting in 2001 and has appeared in several films and series, including The Texas Chainsaw Massacre, The Sisterhood of the Traveling Pants, Grind, Poseidon, Blue Valentine, The Help, Bates Motel, Cloverfield, Under the Dome and The Case for Christ. He starred as the lead in the NBC military drama series The Brave for the 2017–18 season.

Early life and career
Vogel was born in Abington Township, Pennsylvania, a suburb of Philadelphia, to Kathy and Jim Vogel, and was raised in Warminster Township, Pennsylvania. He is of German descent. Both of his grandfathers fought in World War II; one was a tank commander who fought in the Battle of the Bulge, and the other was a Seabee in the Navy. Vogel has two younger siblings: a brother, Daniel Aaron, and a sister, Kristin. He attended William Tennent High School, where he was on the freshman wrestling team.

He also attended Cairn University in Langhorne, Pennsylvania in 1998. During the early 2000s, he frequently traveled to New York City in order to audition for acting roles and modeling slots.

Career

Vogel began modeling jeans for Levi Strauss & Company. He was subsequently cast in the television series Grounded for Life, appearing in a recurring role between 2001 and 2004.

His first film role was in the skateboarding-themed Grind, which was released on August 15, 2003. The film's co-stars included Adam Brody and Jennifer Morrison. Vogel's next role was in the made-for-television remake of Wuthering Heights, which premiered on MTV in September 2003. In the film, Vogel played Heath opposite Erika Christensen's Kate. Vogel's last 2003 role was in the remake of The Texas Chainsaw Massacre, which was released in October and had high box office performance.

In 2005, after Grounded for Life was canceled, Vogel appeared in four film roles. First, he played Eric Richman, the romantic interest of Blake Lively's character in The Sisterhood of the Traveling Pants, which had a June release. His next role was the lead in the low-budget film, Supercross, which was theatrically released in August. Vogel filmed his role in Havoc, a dark, R-rated drama also starring Anne Hathaway, in 2003, but the film was not released until November 2005. It bypassed theaters and was released directly-to-video. Vogel's final 2005 role was in Rumor Has It..., starring Jennifer Aniston, in which he had a supporting role as the son of Kevin Costner's character.

Vogel's first 2006 role was in the disaster film Poseidon, a remake of the 1972 film The Poseidon Adventure; he plays the fiancé of Emmy Rossum's character. The film, which had a budget of $160m, opened on May 12 and grossed  $181,674,817 at the international box office. Vogel was originally offered the role of Angel in X-Men: The Last Stand, but backed out to appear in Poseidon. The same year, he appeared in Caffeine, a romantic comedy and signed to appear in a horror movie called Open Graves, shot in Spain.

In 2007, Vogel appeared in the film The Deaths of Ian Stone, part of the horror film festival 8 Films to Die For. In 2009, Vogel starred in the neo-noir film Across the Hall and the horror film Open Graves. He was part of the 2010 romantic comedy film She's Out of My League, Blue Valentine, TV series Miami Medical, and Heaven's Rain.

Vogel was part of the 2011 comedy film What's Your Number? and plays Johnny Foote in the film adaption The Help. He most recently played Dean on the short-lived ABC drama Pan Am (based on the history of the defunct airline of the same name).

In 2013, he participated in Howard Goldberg's comedy Jake Squared, where he plays against among others, Elias Koteas, Virginia Madsen and Jane Seymour. He also appeared in McCanick, and the first six episodes of Bates Motel. This was A&E's contemporary prequel series to the 1959 novel Psycho.

BuddyTV ranked him #96 on its list of "TV's Sexiest Men of 2011".

Vogel starred as Dale "Barbie" Barbara on the CBS science fiction drama series Under the Dome, based on the novel of the same name by Stephen King. The show aired as a summer series on CBS; it ran for three seasons on the network, ending in September 2015.

In 2014, Vogel received a role in the Hallmark Hall of Fame'''s romantic TV movie In My Dreams, in which he played opposite, among others, Katharine McPhee and JoBeth Williams. In the same year he played in the drama thriller The Boy, which tells the story of a 9-year-old sociopath, who was played by Jared Breeze.

In 2015, Vogel starred in the miniseries Childhood's End, based on the novel of the same name written by Arthur C. Clarke.

In 2017, Vogel starred in the film adaptation of Lee Strobel's The Case for Christ, portraying the author and teaming up again with co-star Erika Christensen.

On September 25, 2017, NBC debuted The Brave, for the 2017–18 season. A small team of hardcore military-intelligence agents from varied branches of the service is selected for special, difficult missions. Among the leads is Vogel's character, Capt. Adam Dalton, the team's communications director and a former Delta Force operative. He reports to the character played by series lead Anne Heche. The series was cancelled after one season.

In December 2018, it was announced that Vogel will star in the Netflix psychological thriller Secret Obsession. The film was released on July 18, 2019.

In February 2019, Vogel played the lead role of David Roman in the ABC science-fiction pilot Triangle'' which was written by Jon Feldman and Sonny Postiglione. ABC passed on the project in September 2019.

In March 2020, it was announced that Vogel would star in an upcoming Netflix series, Sex/Life.

Personal life
Vogel married Courtney, a former model, in January 2003. They have three children: Cassy Renee (b. 20 February 2007), Charlee Bea (b. 2 June 2009), and Gabriel James (b. 25 September 2013). They reside in Nashville, Tennessee.

Filmography

Film

Television

References

External links

 

1979 births
21st-century American male actors
American male film actors
Male models from Pennsylvania
American male television actors
American people of German descent
Aviators from Pennsylvania
Contestants on American game shows
Living people
Male actors from Pennsylvania
Outstanding Performance by a Cast in a Motion Picture Screen Actors Guild Award winners
People from Abington Township, Montgomery County, Pennsylvania
People from Warminster, Pennsylvania